Do Tusuru (also Romanized as Do Tūsūrū) is a village in Kuri Rural District, in the Central District of Jam County, Bushehr Province, Iran. At the 2006 census, its population was 55, in 12 families.

References 

Populated places in Jam County